The 2014 Bucknell Bison football team represented Bucknell University in the 2014 NCAA Division I FCS football season. They were led by fifth-year head coach Joe Susan and played their home games at Christy Mathewson–Memorial Stadium. They were a member of the Patriot League. They finished the season 8–3, 4–2 in Patriot League play to finish in second place.

Schedule

Source: Schedule

References

Bucknell
Bucknell Bison football seasons
Bucknell Bison football